Guigneville is a commune in the Loiret department in north-central France.

Geography
The commune is in the north of the department, in the Beauce, large cereal area with a gentle slope. It is located 7 km northwest of Pithiviers, and 40 km northeast of Orléans. The departmental roads 22, 23 et 134 cross the territory of the commune.

Heritage
Saint-Hilaire church was built in several stages between the 12th and 16th century. It is a listed historic monument since 6 March 1928. It is holding a copy of a 17th century painting by Jean Jouvenet representing the Visitation of the Virgin created for the choir of the cathedral Notre-Dame de Paris. This copy was originally created for the Abbey of Saint-Benoît-sur-Loire, and was classified as a historic object on 5 December 1908.

See also
Communes of the Loiret department

References

Communes of Loiret